Kalat (also Romanized as Kalāt; also known as Kalūt) is a city and capital of Kalat County, in Razavi Khorasan Province, Iran. At the 2006 census, its population was 6,529, in 1,661 families. Nader Shah governed the area after the fall of the Safavids.

See also 

 Kalat-i-nadiri, a massive natural fortress
 Reza Qoli Mirza Afshar

References 

 Tod, J. K. (1923) "Kalat-I-Nadiri", The Geographical Journal 62(5):  pp. 366–370

External links
 Kalāt-e Nāderi, in Persian, Jadid Online, 2006, .A Slide Show of Kalāt-e Nāderi by Shahāb Āzādeh, Jadid Online, 2006,  (2 min 30 sec).
 Farshid Sāmāni, Konj-e Denj-e Fāteh-e Hend (The Quiet Corner of the Conqueror of India), in Persian, Jadid Online, 14 January 2010, .• Audio slideshow:  (3 min 38 sec).

Populated places in Kalat County
Cities in Razavi Khorasan Province
Nishapur Quarter